The Centre Étienne Desmarteau is a multi-purpose complex with two ice rinks in Montreal, Quebec, Canada.

History 
The centre is named in honour of Étienne Desmarteau, a Canadian Olympic athlete during the 1904 Summer Olympics.  The arena hosted the basketball preliminaries during the 1976 Summer Olympics. Following the Olympics, it has been used mostly as an ice hockey venue, while the gyms are used for a variety of sports including indoor soccer, basketball and rhythmic gymnastics.

Description 
The first ice rink in the complex has 2,200 seats and is named after Caroline Ouellette. The second, smaller rink, the Ice rink Jean Trottier, has a 600-person seating capacity. There are also two Olympic gymnasiums, some changing rooms, and one weights room for training.

Tenants 
It was once home to Montreal Juniors hockey team and Les Canadiennes a women's ice hockey team in the Canadian Women's Hockey League. The Montreal Mission, a professional team in the National Ringette League, calls the arena home. Furthermore, numerous amateur tournaments are held in it every year. The upstairs gym contains the home of the Club Rythmik Quebec, a rhythmic gymnastics club offering training up to international level, as well as recreational, pre-competitive, and parent and child classes.

Gallery

References

External links

Direction to Centre Étienne Desmarteau 3430 rue de Bellechasse, Montreal
 Some Informations in Arrondissement.com 
  Étienne-Desmarteau hôte de la seconde Coupe Montréal de hockey féminin  in  journal de Rosemont -La Petite Patrie, February 13, 2008 
Les Stars de Montréal lancent leur saison à Étienne-Desmarteau in Montréal Express journal, December 2008. 
Place aux Filles, le centre Étienne-Desmarteau : le plus occupé de la Coupe Dodge in Journal Rosemont- La Petite Patrie, March 22, 2011. 

Indoor arenas in Quebec
Indoor ice hockey venues in Quebec
Sports venues in Montreal
Venues of the 1976 Summer Olympics
Olympic basketball venues
Rosemont–La Petite-Patrie
Les Canadiennes de Montreal
Sports venues completed in 1976